Calycomyza is a genus of leaf miner flies in the family Agromyzidae. There are at least 30 described species in the genus Calycomyza.

Species
The following species are recognised in the genus Calycomyza:

 Calycomyza ambrosiae (Frick, 1956)
 Calycomyza artemisiae (Kaltenbach, 1856)
 Calycomyza barbarensis Spencer, 1981
 Calycomyza cynoglossi (Frick, 1956)
 Calycomyza durantae Spencer, 1973
 Calycomyza enceliae Spencer, 1981
 Calycomyza eupatorivora Spencer, 1973
 Calycomyza flavinotum (Frick, 1956)
 Calycomyza frickiana Spencer, 1986
 Calycomyza gigantea (Frick, 1956)
 Calycomyza humeralis (Roser, 1840) (aster leafminer)
 Calycomyza hyptidis Spencer, 1966
 Calycomyza ipomaeae (Frost, 1931)
 Calycomyza irwini Spencer, 1981
 Calycomyza jucunda (Wulp, 1867)
 Calycomyza lantanae (Frick, 1956)
 Calycomyza majuscula (Frick, 1956)
 Calycomyza malvae (Burgess, 1880)
 Calycomyza melantherae Spencer, 1966
 Calycomyza menthae Spencer, 1969
 Calycomyza michiganensis Steyskal, 1972
 Calycomyza mikaniae Spencer, 1973
 Calycomyza minor (Spencer, 1973)
 Calycomyza novascotiensis Spencer, 1969
 Calycomyza obscura Spencer, 1973
 Calycomyza orientalis Spencer, 1986
 Calycomyza platyptera (Thomson, 1869)
 Calycomyza promissa (Frick, 1956)
 Calycomyza sidae Spencer, 1973
 Calycomyza solidaginis (Kaltenbach, 1869)
 Calycomyza sonchi Spencer, 1969
 Calycomyza stegmaieri Spencer, 1966
 Calycomyza verbenae (Hering, 1951)

References

Further reading

External links

 Diptera.info

Agromyzidae
Opomyzoidea genera